Reginald Charles Rainey OBE FRS (18 June 1913 – 18 January 1990) was a British entomologist.

References 

1913 births
1990 deaths
Fellows of the Royal Society
Officers of the Order of the British Empire